Your Vision Was Never Mine to Share is the third full-length studio album by Misery Loves Co.

Track listing

References

2000 albums
Misery Loves Co. albums
Earache Records albums